Anna Kiesenhofer (born 14 February 1991) is an Austrian cyclist and mathematician. She is currently a postdoctoral fellow in mathematics at the École Polytechnique Fédérale de Lausanne (EPFL).

Kiesenhofer gained fame when she won the gold medal in the women's individual road race at the 2020 Summer Olympics, the first Summer Olympics gold medal for Austria since 2004 and their first cycling Olympic gold medal since 1896. Unfancied for a medal pre-race, she attacked in the first seconds of the event and soloed to victory, her pursuers mistakenly unaware of her position, in a win described as "one of the greatest upsets in Olympics and cycling history".

Academic career 
Kiesenhofer studied mathematics at the Vienna University of Technology (2008–11), completing her Master's degree at the Emmanuel College, University of Cambridge (2011–12). She earned her PhD at the Polytechnic University of Catalonia with her thesis on Integrable systems on b-symplectic manifolds in 2016.  Kiesenhofer is currently a postdoctoral researcher at the École Polytechnique Fédérale de Lausanne (EPFL) and is part of a group researching nonlinear partial differential equations which arise in mathematical physics. Kiesenhofer has authored several scholarly journal articles including:

 Braddell, R., Kiesenhofer, A., & Miranda, E. (2020). b$-Structures on Lie groups and Poisson reduction. https://arxiv.org/abs/2010.04770
 Kiesenhofer, A., & Krieger, J. (2021). Small data global regularity for half-wave maps in n = 4 dimensions. Communications in Partial Differential Equations, 46(12), 2305–2324. https://doi.org/10.1080/03605302.2021.1936021
 Braddell, R., Kiesenhofer, A., & Miranda, E. (2018). A $b$-symplectic slice theorem. https://arxiv.org/abs/1811.11894
 Kiesenhofer, A., & Miranda, E. (2017). Cotangent Models for Integrable Systems. Communications in Mathematical Physics, 350(3), 1123–1145. https://doi.org/10.1007/s00220-016-2720-x  
 Kiesenhofer, A., & Miranda, E. (2016). Noncommutative integrable systems on b-symplectic manifolds. Regular & Chaotic Dynamics, 21(6), 643–659. https://doi.org/10.1134/S1560354716060058

Cycling career 
Kiesenhofer participated in triathlon and duathlon from 2011 to 2013. After an injury, she had to limit her running and therefore concentrated on cycling from 2014. She joined the Catalan team Frigoríficos Costa Brava – Naturalium. In 2015, she participated in cyclo-sports, including the Gran Fondo New York, which ends at Mont Ventoux and won. She entered the Tour de l'Ardèche but she was the victim of a fall on the first stage. She failed to recover and after several difficult stages decided to withdraw.

In 2016, she won the Coupe d'Espagne. In September, she took part in the Tour de l'Ardèche in the international team. On the third stage, the first breakaway started at the 12th kilometer. It was composed of Dani Christmas, Anna Plichta, Sara Olsson, Vita Heine and Silvia Valsecchi. Twenty kilometers away, they were joined by Kiesenhofer. In the descent of the pass of Murs, the groups were seven minutes and twenty-five seconds ahead. After Blavac, Anna Plichta went off alone and she had a lead of a minute thirty at the foot of Mont Ventoux. On the ascent, Kiesenhofer joined her. She won the stage by almost four minutes over Flávia Oliveira and she took the lead in the overall standings. The next day, Flávia Oliveira escaped in turn and she took Kiesenhofer's pink jersey. She kept her second place in the overall standings until the end of the race.

In July 2021, as Austria's sole representative in the 137 km-long Olympic women's road race in Tokyo, Japan, she won the gold medal, crossing the finish line 75 seconds in front of Annemiek van Vleuten of the Netherlands. Kiesenhofer trained for the event without a coach or a professional team, and was not viewed as a contender to win a medal. In the race, she initiated a breakaway from the start, and was joined by four other competitors. With 86 km to go, the leading group, now down to Kiesenhofer, Omer Shapira, and Anna Plichta, formed a 10-minute advantage over the chasing peloton. Kiesenhofer broke away by herself for the final 41 km while climbing the Kagosaka Pass, dropping Shapira and Plichta, who were later caught by the peloton. Many in the peloton, including silver medalist Van Vleuten who celebrated mistakenly thinking she had won the gold, finished the race unaware that Kiesenhofer was still in front of them. Kiesenhofer later said she "couldn't believe" she won adding that she would have been happy with a top 25 finish.

Major results 

2015
1st Overall Semaine Cantalienne
1st Stages 2 & 6

2016
 2nd Overall Tour Cycliste Féminin International de l'Ardèche
1st Stage 3
 2nd Time trial, National Road Championships
Copa de España
2nd Gran Premio Comunidad de Cantabria
2nd Trofeo Zamora
4th Trofeo Gobierno de La Rioja
5th Zizurkil-Villabona
7th Trofeo Ria de Marin
10th Trofeo Bicicletas Jonny

2018
5th Thun-West Time trial

2019
 National Road Championships
1st  Time trial
1st  Road race
4th Thun-West Time trial
 5th Ljubljana–Domžale–Ljubljana TT
 5th Time trial, European Road Championships
 8th Chrono des Nations

2020
 1st  Time trial, National Road Championships
1st Hochkar Bergeinzelzeitfahren Time trial
 3rd Overall Tour Cycliste Féminin International de l'Ardèche

2021
 1st  Road race, Olympic Games
 1st  Time trial, National Road Championships
 2nd Chrono des Nations
 7th Time trial, UEC European Road Championships

Awards 
Kiesenhofer was awarded the Niki prize as Sportlerin des Jahres 2021 (Sportswoman of the Year) by Sports Media Austria, an association of sports journalists. That year she was also named Lower Austria's sportswoman of the year and won the international success category at Die Presse's Austrian of the Year awards.

References 

Austrian female cyclists
1991 births
Living people
Olympic cyclists of Austria
Cyclists at the 2020 Summer Olympics
Olympic gold medalists for Austria
Olympic medalists in cycling
Medalists at the 2020 Summer Olympics
Austrian mathematicians
People from Mistelbach District
TU Wien alumni
Alumni of Emmanuel College, Cambridge
Polytechnic University of Catalonia alumni
Academic staff of the École Polytechnique Fédérale de Lausanne
Women mathematicians